The 1974 All-Ireland Senior Football Championship was the 88th staging of the All-Ireland Senior Football Championship, the Gaelic Athletic Association's premier inter-county Gaelic football tournament. The championship began on 19 May 1974 and ended on 22 September 1974.

Cork were the defending champions, however, they were defeated by Dublin in the All-Ireland semi-final.

On 22 September 1974, Dublin won the championship following a 0–14 to 1–6 defeat of Galway in the All-Ireland final. This was their 18th All-Ireland title, their first in eleven championship seasons.

Dublin's Jimmy Keaveney was the championship's top scorer with 1–36. Dublin manager Kevin Heffernan was the choice for Texaco Footballer of the Year, the first time that the award went to a manager instead of a player.

Team summaries

Results

Connacht Senior Football Championship

Quarter-final

Semi-finals

Final

Leinster Senior Football Championship

First round

Second round

Quarter-finals

 

Semi-finals

Final

Munster Senior Football Championship

Quarter-finals

 

Semi-finals

 

Final

Ulster Senior Football Championship

Preliminary round

Quarter-finals

Semi-finals

 
 

Finals

All-Ireland Senior Football Championship

Semi-finals

Final

Championship statistics

Miscellaneous

 Dublin win the Leinster title for the first time since 1965.
 The All-Ireland semi-finals between Donegal and Galway was the very first championship meeting between the two sides, while the other was the first meeting between Dublin and Cork since the All Ireland final of 1907.
 Dublin win the All-Ireland title for the first time since 1963.

Top scorers
Overall

Single game

References